Kerry Dale Earnhardt (born December 8, 1969) is a former NASCAR driver and the eldest son of seven-time NASCAR Cup Series champion Dale Earnhardt. He is the half-brother of former NASCAR Cup Series driver Dale Earnhardt Jr. He was employed by Dale Earnhardt, Inc. as a consultant specializing in driver development until 2011. His younger son, Jeffrey Earnhardt, began racing for DEI in 2007 and currently competes in the NASCAR Xfinity Series. Kerry Earnhardt is known for his physical similarity to his father.

Early life
Kerry Earnhardt's mother, Latane Brown, was Dale Earnhardt's first wife. Dale Earnhardt was 18 years old and a local North Carolina dirt racer at the time of Kerry's birth. The couple divorced when Kerry was one year old. Brown eventually married Jack Key, who adopted Kerry; Kerry used his stepfather's surname for much of his life. Until he was 16, he saw little of his biological father.

Prior to his racing career, Earnhardt dropped out of high school and worked several odd jobs to support his family. This included working at a Pizza Hut and in the Cannon Mills in Kannapolis, North Carolina, where his grandfather, Ralph Earnhardt, also worked.

Racing career
Earnhardt began racing in 1992 driving street stocks. That same season, he raced in the NASCAR Goody's Dash Series. He raced at various tracks in 1993, including the East Carolina Motor Speedway near Robersonville, North Carolina and Langley Speedway in Hampton, Virginia. He scored two top fives and eight top 10s in 11 races and was the 1992 Rookie of the Year.

Earnhardt won a pole position and recorded eight top 5s and 40 top 10s as well as 1994 Rookie of the Year honors at his local track, Hickory Motor Speedway, in the NASCAR Dodge Weekly Racing Series. His first NASCAR start came in the Busch Series at Myrtle Beach in 1998. After select Busch races in 1998 and 1999, he raced in the Automobile Racing Club of America's ARCA Racing Series in 2000 and 2001 for Dale Earnhardt, Inc. (DEI) using DEI NASCAR Cup Series (known as the Winston Cup Series to 2003) equipment formerly used by Steve Park. During this stint, he won four of his 11 starts, with seven top fives and eight top 10s.

In 2000, Earnhardt made his Winston Cup debut at Michigan driving for Marcis Auto Racing, racing against both his father and his half-brother, Dale Earnhardt Jr. He wrecked out of the race on lap five. It was the first of his seven Winston Cup starts. In 2001, the same year his father was killed at Daytona, Earnhardt was involved in a massive crash on October 4 in an ARCA race at Charlotte Motor Speedway. On lap 63 of 67, Earnhardt had to dodge a lapped car by hitting his brakes, which caused Blaise Alexander's No. 75 car to catch up to Earnhardt. Alexander began to inch into the lead when Earnhardt's car made contact with Alexander's, sending Alexander's car head-on into the wall and back into Earnhardt's car, causing Earnhardt to flip over onto his roof and slide into the grass. Earnhardt managed to climb out by himself. Alexander was given a red flag and the race director called it official, which gave Earnhardt the victory. Alexander was pronounced dead in the infield care center at 10:20 p.m.

In late November 2001, it was announced that Earnhardt would run the full 2002 Busch Series for FitzBradshaw Racing, owned by Armando Fitz and Terry Bradshaw. The entry was sponsored by Supercuts and 10-10-220, with a technical alliance with DEI. The car was initially numbered 8, but later numbered 12. He finished 22nd in points, scoring three top fives and six top 10s. This was one of his two full seasons in any of NASCAR's top three series (Cup, Busch, and Truck). He also attempted to make several Winston Cup races in 2002 and 2003 in the No. 83 Aaron's, Inc./Hot Tamales Chevrolet for FitzBradshaw, but failed to qualify for every race he attempted. Midway through the 2003 season, Earnhardt was released by FitzBradshaw, replaced by Tim Fedewa.

In 2004 and 2005, Earnhardt raced in six Cup Series races for Richard Childress Racing in the No. 33 car. All six starts were restrictor plate races (Daytona and Talladega). His highest finish was a 17th-place run at Talladega in the 2005 Aaron's 499. Also in 2004, Earnhardt made eight starts in the K&N Pro Series West for Bill McAnally Racing, scoring two top fives and five top 10s.

In 2005, Earnhardt joined Billy Ballew Motorsports in the Craftsman Truck Series, replacing Shane Hmiel. Earnhardt won the pole position for the season opening Florida Dodge Dealers 250, but he lost his ride after two races due to lack of sponsorship, with Hmiel returning. For the 2006 season, he signed with ThorSport Racing and drove the No. 13 Chevrolet the full season with occasional sponsorship from the National Pork Board. His best finish of the season was 11th place at Nashville and Las Vegas. At the conclusion of the season, he and ThorSport Racing went their separate ways.

In December 2007, Earnhardt announced his retirement as a competitive driver in a letter to fans on his website.

Earnhardt is still an active test driver for DEI and occasionally drove in the Nationwide Series (NNS). His last appearance in a national touring series was the NNS' Subway Jalapeño 250 on July 3, 2009 at Daytona International Speedway driving the No. 31 car for Rick Ware Racing. In 2016, he drove one of his father's original race cars, a No. 3 1995 Chevrolet Monte Carlo, at the Goodwood Festival of Speed in England.

Family life
He and wife, René, married in 1999. They have a daughter, Kayla. From their previous marriages, Kerry has two sons, Bobby and Jeffrey, and René has a daughter, Blade. In 2017, Bobby Earnhardt raced part-time in the ARCA Racing Series, driving the number 3 Chevrolet for Hixson Motorsports and the number 96 Ford for Brian Kaltreider Racing. He made his NASCAR debut in the Xfinity Series driving the No. 40 Chevy Camaro for MBM Motorsports at Richmond in 2017. As of 2022, Jeffrey Earnhardt races in the NASCAR Xfinity Series for Sam Hunt Racing and Richard Childress Racing, and has previously raced in the NASCAR Cup Series. Bobby and Jeffrey are the fourth generation of Earnhardts in professional motorsports.

Legal issues
In May 2016, Earnhardt's stepmother, Teresa Earnhardt, sued him for using the Earnhardt name when he and his wife were planning to market a line of homes and furniture under the name "The Earnhardt Collection". On July 27, 2017, Teresa Earnhardt won an appeal which required the U.S. Trademark Trial and Appeal Board to clarify its decision to allow him to use the name "Earnhardt Collection" in his business.

Motorsports career results

NASCAR
(key) (Bold – Pole position awarded by qualifying time. Italics – Pole position earned by points standings or practice time. * – Most laps led.)

Cup Series

Daytona 500

Nationwide Series

Craftsman Truck Series

ARCA Re/Max Series
(key) (Bold – Pole position awarded by qualifying time. Italics – Pole position earned by points standings or practice time. * – Most laps led.)

References

External links
 
 

1969 births
ARCA Menards Series drivers
Kerry
ISCARS Dash Touring Series drivers
Living people
NASCAR drivers
People from Kannapolis, North Carolina
Racing drivers from Charlotte, North Carolina
Racing drivers from North Carolina
Dale Earnhardt Inc. drivers
Richard Childress Racing drivers
Michael Waltrip Racing drivers